Crnac is a village and municipality in Croatia in the Virovitica–Podravina County. It has a total population of 1,456, distributed in the following settlements:
 Breštanovci, population 153
 Crnac, population 494
 Krivaja Pustara, population 3
 Mali Rastovac, population 54
 Milanovac, population 54
 Novo Petrovo Polje, population 164
 Staro Petrovo Polje, population 182
 Suha Mlaka, population 105
 Veliki Rastovac, population 238
 Žabnjača, population 9

In the 2011 census, 92% of the population were Croats.

References

Municipalities of Croatia
Populated places in Virovitica-Podravina County